Nothocyon is an extinct genus of carnivoran which inhabited North America during the late Oligocene. At one time, many species of the dog family Canidae were placed in Nothocyon, but new fossils showed that the type species of Nothocyon, N. geismarianus, is more closely related to bears. The other species have been reassigned to other genera such as Cormocyon.

References

 Martin, L.D. 1989. Fossil history of the terrestrial carnivora. Pages 536 - 568 in J.L. Gittleman, editor. Carnivore Behavior, Ecology, and Evolution, Vol. 1. Comstock Publishing Associates: Ithaca.
 Tedford, R.H. 1978. History of dogs and cats: A view from the fossil record. Pages 1 – 10 in Nutrition and Management of Dogs and Cats. Ralston Purina Co.: St. Louis.
 PaleoBiology Database: Nothocyon

Oligocene caniforms
Oligocene mammals of North America
Prehistoric carnivoran genera